Blues and Haikus is the American novelist and poet Jack Kerouac's second album and was released in 1959.

History
On the album, Kerouac's poetry readings are accompanied by jazz saxophonists Al Cohn and Zoot Sims. The album is included in the CD box set The Jack Kerouac Collection.

Track listing

Side One
"American Haikus" – 10:01
"Hard Hearted Old Farmer" – 2:13
"The Last Hotel/Some of the Dharma" – 3:49

Side Two
"Poems from the Unpublished Book of Blues" – 14:05

Bonus Tracks on 1990 CD issue
(Outtakes from the Blues and Haikus recording sessions)
"Old Western Movies" - 6:42
"Conclusion of the Railroad Earth" - 10:05

References

1959 albums
Jack Kerouac albums
Albums produced by Bob Thiele
Hanover Records albums